The Stimson Mini Bug is a Mini-based beach buggy-styled motor vehicle designed by Barry Stimson. The Mk1 was produced from 1970 until the following year, during which time about 20 were made. It was replaced by the Mk2 in 1971, which continued in production until 1973. About 160 Mk2s were made.

A racing version of the Mini Bug Mk2 – the CS+1 – was developed and offered for sale in 1972 by Stimson's Barrian Cars, then based in London, and later by Lainston Investment Services of Sparsholt, Hampshire. Only four were sold.

References

Citations

Bibliography

External links
Video of the Mini Bug in action

Cars introduced in 1971
Cars introduced in 1970
Cars of England
Cars discontinued in 1973